Peter Aimat Lokeris (born 2 February 1947) is a Ugandan politician and accountant. He is the current Minister of State for Minerals in the Cabinet of Uganda. He was appointed to this position on 16 February 2009. In the cabinet reshuffle of 27 May 2011, and that of 1 March 2015, Peter Lokeris retained his cabinet post. He is also the elected Member of Parliament representing Chekwii County in Nakapiripirit District. He has continuously represented that constituency since 1996.

Background and education
He was born in Pian county in Nakapiripirit District on 2 February 1947 to Teko Apo-oroma Namoni-Angitiang and his wife Aisu Elizabeth. He holds the degree of Bachelor of Commerce from Makerere University. He also holds a Diploma in Finance from the Uganda Management Institute in Kampala. He also holds a Master of Science in Marketing) from Makerere University and another Master of Arts in Peace and Conflict Studies from the same university.

Work experience
Peter Lokeris started his working career as a cashier. He also worked as an Internal Auditor for Moroto District. He then worked as the Chief Accountant for Kotido District. Following that, he served as the Administrative Secretary for Moroto District for a period of four years. Lokeris also served as a special district administrator in the districts of Moroto, Kasese and Jinja. Later, he served as a special presidential advisor on peace and development of Karamoja and its neighbouring regions for four years.

In 1996, he entered politics, contesting and winning the parliamentary seat of Chekwii County in Nakapiripirit District. During that same year, he was appointed as Minister of State for Karamoja. He maintained that position during a cabinet reshuffle on 13 January 2005. In 2006, he was re-elected to his parliamentary seat. On 1 June 2006, he was appointed as Minister of State for Primary Education. In another cabinet reshuffle, Peter Lokeris was appointed Minister of State for Minerals on 16 February 2009. Lokeris was re-elected as member of parliament for Chekwi county on 18 February 2011. In the cabinet reshuffle of 27 May 2011, he retained his cabinet post as State Minister for Minerals.

Personal affairs
Peter Lokeris is married. He belongs to the National Resistance Movement political party. He enjoys playing and watching basketball. Lokeris is a passionate cattle rancher and has a cattle ranch.

See also
 Cabinet of Uganda
 Parliament of Uganda
 Nakapiripirit District

References

1947 births
Living people
People from Nakapiripirit District
Members of the Parliament of Uganda
Government ministers of Uganda
National Resistance Movement politicians
Makerere University alumni
Uganda Management Institute alumni
Ugandan accountants
21st-century Ugandan politicians